Stingray  (aka Abigail: Wanted in Australia) is a 1978 action comedy film written and directed by Richard Taylor. 
The film was released theatrically by Avco Embassy Pictures in August 1978. The plot concerns two buddies who buy a 1964 Corvette Stingray, unaware that it is filled with drugs and stolen money. The crooks responsible for planting it in the car soon give chase, along with a number of clueless police officers.  It was filmed primarily in Edwardsville, Illinois.

Plot
Murray Lonigan (William Watson), whose catchphrase is "icy calm," and Tony Agrosio (Bert Hinchman) are two small-time drug dealers who are set up by two crooks (Anthony Miller, Edward Morrison) during a drug trade. They planted a homer (a tracking device) inside a briefcase containing $1,000,000, after finding out, they brutally shoot both of them. Desperate, they store the money and drugs into a Corvette Stingray in a used car lot. Slim (Morgan Hatch), the owner, comes out to see what's going on. With nothing or no one in sight, Slim puts a Sold sign on the Corvette's windshield.

Meanwhile, at the local A&W restaurant, Lonigan and Tony are enjoying their food when two cops bust them and take them to the station. The disgruntled Lieutenant Herschel (Richard Cosentino) is forced to let them go when the police were unable to find anything in their car, but Herschel orders his partner Sgt. Murphy (Harry Gorsuch) to follow them, anyway. Soon after, we are introduced to Lonigan and Tony's leader Abigail Bratowski (Sherry Jackson) who is disguised as a nun to avoid being recognized because she's wanted by the police in several states. The three head to the car lot with Murphy on their tail, but his car soon gets disabled by jumping over a steep hill. Then they pick up another of their cronies Rosco (Cliff Emmich) who has a habit of urinating multiple times in one hour, which is a running gag in the first half of the film.

Much to their dismay, they find out that the car is being bought by two buddies Al (Christopher Mitchum) and Elmo (Les Lannom). As they speed out of the car lot, the gang begins to pursue them, but Al soon gets pulled over for speeding
by two cops. Both of them eventually get killed and their car blows up when the four criminals shoot it to oblivion. Tired of distractions and complications, Lonigan decides to purchase a homer of his own so he and the gang can track them down more easily. When they catch up with them again, along with Herschel and Murphy in a police car, they manage to disrupt a concert in the park by knocking over the stage, musicians, and sound equipment and Herschel's car ends up getting disabled when a fallen ladder damages the car's radiator. The chase is once again cut short when Abigail demands Lonigan to pull over so she can change out of her nun costume, causing another delay. Thinking that they lost them, Al and Elmo pull the car into a service station to get gas and Al decides to use the phone booth to call the police to explain the situation. When Elmo uses his jacket to wipe the sweat off his face, he notices bags of heroin in the backseat. He runs over and yanks Al out of the phone booth, causing him to rip the receiver out. Though annoyed with Elmo, he manages to persuade him that they should peddle the heroin for money or end up getting killed by the cops. As they begin to leave, Lonigan spots them and Al immediately peels out of the station, with Elmo forcing to take a shortcut by running into the woods, with Abigail and Rosco on his tail. After destroying the roadside snack stand next to the station, Lonigan and Tony go after Al, thinking it will be an easier way to get rid of Abigail since the two are fed up with her.

As the chase begins, it gets interrupted by two country hicks, in a delivery truck, blocking their path, Lonigan throws a grenade into the back of their truck, causing them to stop and run for their lives. Al eventually loses them in a construction site by temporarily disabling Lonigan's car with a bulldozer. Meanwhile, in the woods, Elmo hides up in a tree to avoid being spotted by Abigail
and Rosco. Elmo eventually falls to the ground, but manages to run away as the two shoot at him. Abagail accidentally kills Rosco with her machine gun  after a brief scuffle. Elmo eventually steals a motorcycle from a young, naked couple making out in the woods and Abagail steals the other one, but soon after, she ends up losing him when she crashes it during a jump and its runs out of gas. She eventually meets up with Lonigan and Tony at the construction site, not knowing that she killed Rosco. She manages to free the car from the bulldozer and they try to find the Corvette.

As night falls, Al decides to make a stop at a neighborhood bar called Ronnie B's to relax and have a beer. Not long after, a weary and filthy-looking Elmo arrives and decides to clean up in the bathroom, but Abagail, Lonigan, and Tony arrive thanks to the homer. Abagail instructs Tony to stand guard outside while she and Lonigan go in to find them. Once in there, a bar patron (John Carl Buechler) tries to hit on Abagail, but she ends up setting his crotch on fire with a cigarette lighter. The pandemonium eventually erupts in an all-out bar fight and amidst the chaos, Al and Elmo sneak out of the bathroom window and are immediately caught by Tony, but Elmo knocks him out after he punches Al to the ground and they escape in the Corvette. At his boiling point, Lonigan lays it on the line with Tony saying he and Tony will not take the heat for this caper and decide to abandon Abagail altogether. They try to run her over in the parking lot, but get chased away by her gunfire. Shortly after, Herschel and Murphy arrive in the bar with all the patrons and employees laying around in disarray after Abagail fired bullets in the air to stop the fight. Herschel then orders Murphy to put out an APB on Abagail and her cronies.

The next day, Al and Elmo are seen driving back into the city, hoping to find another way out of this whole mess. Elmo picks up a hitchhiking girl (Sondra Theodore) for no apparent reason as Al thinks it is not a good idea, at the moment. Elmo thinks the only way to elude them is disguising the car in a different color, something Al is not too thrilled with. Meanwhile, Abagail manages to steal an Austin Healey by fatally shooting the driver and putting his body in the backseat. As Abagail sneaks up to Lonigan and Tony, she kills Lonigan by stabbing him in the neck with an ice pick. She attempts to kill Tony, too, but decides to spare his life, providing he will share the million dollars with her. Al, Elmo, and the hitchhiker accidentally pull the Corvette into a car wash, causing the new paint job to wash away, blowing their cover. Abagail and Tony engage in one final chase that ends in a dead end embankment road under a city bridge. Elmo disables Abagail and Tony's car by blowing up its engine with Abagail's Machine gun that Tony left back at Ronnie B's accidentally. Al, Elmo, and the girl retreat and Abagail gets shot by Tony, stating that he does not share a million dollars with nobody. Thinking she died of the wound, Tony collects the heroin bags and starts to leave in the Corvette, but she sits up and fatally shoots Tony multiple times. Despite being shot, she tries to get into the Corvette, herself, but the machine gun Elmo left behind is standing next to the car door and the gun's charge ignites when she tries to shut it, causing it to shoot her in the head. Suddenly, Herschel, Murphy, and a squad of policemen arrive on the scene and discover all of the dead bodies, including Lonigan's in the back seat of their car. Later on, Al and Elmo attempt to locate the suitcase of money the girl managed to sneak away from the crime scene, but they discover it's gone. They find out that a derelict had stole the case and they chase after him under the bridge supporter. Al tries to retrieve it, but falls into the river and never comes back up.

The final sequence has Elmo explaining to the girl saying they should have gone to the police, originally and blames himself for being too greedy, but Elmo notices Al's body floating over to the shore. He runs over and discovers Al was pretending to have drowned just to play a joke on Elmo. They plan to return the money to the police, but Elmo suggests they use the money to go on a vacation to Bolivia. The three embrace and they happily skip away.

References

External links

1970s action comedy films
1978 films
American action comedy films
Films shot in Illinois
Edwardsville, Illinois
Embassy Pictures films
1970s comedy road movies
1978 comedy films
American comedy road movies
Films about drugs
Films scored by Byron Berline
Films scored by J. A. C. Redford
1970s English-language films
1970s American films